Gottlieb Jaan Ast (2 March 1874 – 15 December 1919) was an Estonian politician who was the mayor of Tallinn from June to July 1919. 

Ast graduated from the Faculty of Law at the University of Tartu in 1906. Afterwards, he became involved in politics and was active in southern Estonia as a socialist agitator. After the failed 1905 Russian Revolution, he emigrated to Switzerland in 1906 and to Dresden, Germany, and later the United States, but returned to Estonia after the February Revolution. After returning to Estonia, he joined the Estonian Social Democratic Workers' Party and was elected as a representative of the party to the Tallinn City Government and was later the mayor of Tallinn, where he served for one month, from June to July 1919. He died of tuberculosis in December 1919 and was buried in Rahumäe cemetery. His younger brother was politician and writer Karl Ast.

See also
List of mayors of Tallinn

References

1874 births
1919 deaths
People from Võru Parish
People from Kreis Werro
Estonian Social Democratic Workers' Party politicians
Mayors of Tallinn
Estonian expatriates in Germany
Estonian expatriates in Switzerland
Estonian expatriates in the United States
University of Tartu alumni
20th-century deaths from tuberculosis
Tuberculosis deaths in Estonia
Burials at Rahumäe Cemetery